East Barkwith is a village and civil parish in the East Lindsey district of Lincolnshire, England.

The parish church is dedicated to Saint Mary and is a Grade II* listed building dating from the early 12th century, with later restorations, and is built of greenstone, limestone and ironstone.

There was a school here which opened in January 1873 as a National School. and closed in April 1987 as East Barkwith CE School.

The village was served by East Barkwith railway station which opened in 1876 and closed in 1958.

East Barkwith civil parish includes the village of Panton. It also includes the deserted medieval village (DMV), of Hardwick, which is listed in the Domesday Book of 1086.

References

External links

Villages in Lincolnshire
Civil parishes in Lincolnshire
East Lindsey District